Arthur David Brent Cooper (born 14 September 1960) is a New Zealand judoka and judo administrator. He competed in the half lightweight event at the 1990 Commonwealth Games where he won a gold medal. He also competed at the 1988 Olympic Games where he finished fifth. He later became head coach of Judo New Zealand.

References

External links 
Brent Cooper at judoinside.com

1960 births
Living people
New Zealand male judoka
Commonwealth Games gold medallists for New Zealand
New Zealand sports coaches
Olympic judoka of New Zealand
People from Ōtaki, New Zealand
Commonwealth Games medallists in judo
Judoka at the 1990 Commonwealth Games
Sportspeople from the Wellington Region
Judoka at the 1988 Summer Olympics
Medallists at the 1990 Commonwealth Games